"Right By Your Side" is a song written and produced by N-Force and Darren Styles. The vocals are sung by Lois McConnell from N-Force and it was released on 9 June 2008 (the same month as Darren Styles and Ultrabeat released Discolights which peaked 23 in the UK.

Track listing

CD Single / Download
Radio Edit (3:23)
Extended Mix (5:22)
ReCon Remix (5:54)
Ultrabeat Remix (6:29)
Styles & Breeze Remix (5:47)
Riffs & Rays Remix (8:00)
Download
Radio Edit (3:23)
ReCon Edit (2:50)
Riffs & Rays Radio Edit (3:10)
Hypasonic Remix (6:33)
KB Project Remix (6:20)
JC Remix (5:50)
Fugitive's Side On Mix (5:05)
12" Promo
Original Mix
Ultrabeat Remix
Hypasonic Remix
KB Project Remix
Re-Con Remix
CD Promo
Radio Edit
Extended Mix
Ultrabeat Remix
Hypasonic Remix
Riffs & Rays Remix
KB Project Remix
Fugitive's Side On Remix
JC Remix
Riffs & Rays Radio Edit

Music video
The music video is mainly based in a street when lead singer Lois McConnell looks sad and also dances in front of lights. The video also features Darren Styles DJing in the background while Lois dances in the foreground.

Charts
On 29 June 2008 the song entered the UK Singles Chart at #87 on downloads alone and rose to #77 the following the physical release. It also managed to peak #46 in Germany and #8 on the UK Dance Chart

2008 singles
Darren Styles songs
Songs written by Darren Styles
2008 songs